Mandaree (Hidatsa: Adixoodagoorahareesh) is a census-designated place (CDP) in McKenzie County, North Dakota, United States. The population was 596 at the 2010 census.

Mandaree is located on the Fort Berthold Indian Reservation in the Mandan, Hidatsa and Arikara Nation. It was founded in 1954 as a home for those displaced by the rising backwaters of the Garrison Dam. The name was suggested by a Catholic missionary on the reservation and is a portmanteau of the names of the three tribes: MANdan, HiDAtsa, and REE, another name for the Arikara.

Mandaree is the primary physical center of the Mandan-Hidatsa community. It is noted nationally for its annual Pow-wow, held the second weekend in July, as well as for being the home of the Mandaree Singers, a tribal musical group.

Geography
Mandaree is located at  (47.730127, -102.675465).

Demographics

As of the census of 2000, there were 558 people, 132 households, and 119 families residing in the CDP. The population density was 50.0 people per square mile (19.3/km2). There were 151 housing units at an average density of 13.5/sq mi (5.2/km2). The racial makeup of the CDP was 3.05% White, 95.88% Native American, 0.18% from other races, and 0.90% from two or more races. Hispanic or Latino of any race were 1.97% of the population.

There were 132 households, out of which 59.8% had children under the age of 18 living with them, 34.1% were married couples living together, 40.9% had a female householder with no husband present, and 9.8% were non-families. 8.3% of all households were made up of individuals, and 3.0% had someone living alone who was 65 years of age or older. The average household size was 4.23 and the average family size was 4.31.

In the CDP, the population was spread out, with 48.7% under the age of 18, 9.9% from 18 to 24, 23.8% from 25 to 44, 13.1% from 45 to 64, and 4.5% who were 65 years of age or older. The median age was 18 years. For every 100 females, there were 97.2 males. For every 100 females age 18 and over, there were 88.2 males.

The median income for a household in the CDP was $24,167, and the median income for a family was $22,500. Males had a median income of $19,688 versus $17,604 for females. The per capita income for the CDP was $6,179. About 33.9% of families and 35.4% of the population were below the poverty line, including 38.9% of those under age 18 and 51.4% of those age 65 or over.

Education
Mandaree Public School District #36 is made up of Mandaree Elementary School and Mandaree High School.  Both schools are funded by the Bureau of Indian Education (BIE) and the state of North Dakota. The teams are called the "Mandaree Warriors" and "Lady Warriors."

The Crestwood Maagarishda Center, which includes a Head Start center, opened in 2019. The cost was $2.3 million.

Notable people

 Former tribal chairman Tex G. Hall
 1986-1990 Tribal Chairman--Edward Lone Fight

References

Census-designated places in McKenzie County, North Dakota
Census-designated places in North Dakota
Populated places established in 1954
1954 establishments in North Dakota
Unincorporated communities in North Dakota
Unincorporated communities in McKenzie County, North Dakota
Mandan, Hidatsa, and Arikara Nation